Henry Monroe Jones (May 10, 1857 – May 31, 1955) was a professional baseball player who played second base and outfield in the Major Leagues for the 1884 Detroit Wolverines.

External links

1857 births
1955 deaths
Major League Baseball second basemen
Detroit Wolverines players
19th-century baseball players
Grand Rapids (minor league baseball) players
Chattanooga (minor league baseball) players
Baseball players from New York (state)